Under the Bridge is an upcoming American true crime drama television miniseries based upon the book of the same name by Rebecca Godfrey. It follows the murder of 14-year old Reena Virk, as a woman enters the hidden world of the accused killers. It is set to premiere on Hulu.

Cast and characters

Main
 Riley Keough as Rebecca Godfrey
 Izzy G as Kelly Ellard
 Chloe Guidry as Josephine Bell
 Michael Buie as George Spiros
 Ezra Farouke Khan as Manjit Virk
 Archie Panjabi as Suman Virk
 Vritika Gupta as Reena Virk
 Javon Walton as Warren
 Aiyana Goodfellow as Dusty
 Lily Gladstone as Cam Bentland

Production

Development
In September 2022, Hulu gave the series an 8-episode order, with Samir Mehta and Liz Tigelaar set to executive produce, with Quinn Shephard adapting the book of the same name by Rebecca Godfrey.

Casting
In December 2022, Riley Keough, Izzy G, Chloe Guidry, Ezra Faroque Khan, Archie Panjabi, Vritika Gupta, Javon Walton, Aiyana Goodfellow and Lily Gladstone joined the cast of the series, in series regular capacity.

Filming
Principal photography began by December 2022.

References

External links
 

Television series by ABC Signature Studios
English-language television shows
Hulu original programming